is a former Japanese football player.

Playing career
Tokioka was born in Saitama Prefecture on June 24, 1974. After graduating from National Institute of Fitness and Sports in Kanoya, he joined Japan Football League club Consadole Sapporo in 1997. The club won the 2nd place in 1997 and was promoted to J1 League from 1998. Although he played as midfielder in 1998, the club was relegated to J2 League in a year. In 1999, he could not play at all in the match. In 2000, he moved to Regional Leagues club Sagawa Express Tokyo. The club was promoted to Japan Football League from 2001. He retired end of 2001 season.

Club statistics

References

External links

consadeconsa.com

1974 births
Living people
National Institute of Fitness and Sports in Kanoya alumni
Association football people from Saitama Prefecture
Japanese footballers
J1 League players
J2 League players
Japan Football League (1992–1998) players
Japan Football League players
Hokkaido Consadole Sapporo players
Sagawa Shiga FC players
Association football midfielders